Commander Rupert Arnold Brabner  (29 October 1911 – 27 March 1945) was a British Member of Parliament (MP) who served with the Royal Navy as a pilot in the Second World War and became an ace with 5.5 confirmed kills.

Politics
Brabner, from Loughton in Essex, was educated at Felsted School and St Catharine's College, Cambridge. By profession, he was a banker and a director of Singer & Friedlander Ltd.

Brabner became a member of London County Council for West Lewisham in 1937, and served until his death. He was elected to the House of Commons as MP for Hythe in Kent on 20 July 1939, and was later appointed as a government whip. He was appointed to be Joint Parliamentary Under-Secretary of State for Air in 1944.

He and his sister Jean Gwenneth (also killed in World War II) are commemorated by a blue plaque on the family home at Loughton. His sister was a surgeon at St. Giles Hospital who was killed in a German V-1 rocket attack on London.

War service
Brabner served as an officer of the Royal Naval Volunteer Reserve during the Second World War as a Fleet Air Arm pilot.

From 11 August 1941 to September 1942, Brabner was the commanding officer of 801 Squadron serving aboard Eagle, which was sunk on 11 August 1942. He was awarded the Distinguished Service Order for his actions during Operation Harpoon. After surviving the loss of the Eagle, he was appointed to the staff of Clement Moody, Vice-Admiral, Aircraft Carriers, for landings in North Africa. In 1943, Brabner was made naval assistant (technical) to the 5th Sea Lord. For his actions in August 1943 during Operation Pedestal, he was awarded the Distinguished Service Cross.

Brabner was an air ace with five confirmed destroyed enemy aircraft, one shared destroyed, and one probable.

Commander Brabner died age 33 when the Liberator aircraft taking him to Canada with Air Marshal Peter Drummond was lost off the Azores. He is commemorated on the Lee-on-Solent Memorial on bay 6, panel 2

References

 RNVR service history

External links 
 

1911 births
1945 deaths
Alumni of St Catharine's College, Cambridge
British World War II flying aces
British bankers
Royal Navy personnel killed in World War II
Companions of the Distinguished Service Order
Conservative Party (UK) MPs for English constituencies
Fleet Air Arm aviators
Members of London County Council
Ministers in the Churchill wartime government, 1940–1945
People educated at Felsted School
People from Loughton
People lost at sea
Recipients of the Distinguished Service Cross (United Kingdom)
Royal Naval Volunteer Reserve personnel of World War II
Royal Navy officers of World War II
Fleet Air Arm personnel of World War II
UK MPs 1935–1945
Military personnel from Essex